Schriemer is a surname. Notable people with the surname include:

Adam Schriemer (born 1995), Canadian volleyball player
Joceline Schriemer, Canadian provincial politician